West India Squadron may refer to:

 The North America and West Indies Station of the Royal Navy during the Napoleonic Wars
 The West India Squadron, a component of the United States Navy in the Union blockade during the American Civil War

See also
West Indies Squadron (disambiguation)